Megathymus cofaqui, the Cofaqui giant-skipper, is a butterfly in the family Hesperiidae. Its range is limited to a north–south swath through the middle of Georgia in the United States.

References

Megathyminae
Butterflies of North America